Miya's was a restaurant in New Haven, Connecticut, United States, credited as the first sustainable sushi restaurant in the world. The restaurant was founded by Yoshiko Lai, a Japanese nutritionist. As of 2021, they are permanently closed.

Cuisine
In 1982, Miya's was the first sushi restaurant in Connecticut, specializing in Kyushi-style recipes. With the creation of the sweet potato roll in 1995, Miya's began to create a plant-based sushi menu. By the late 1990s, 80% of the sushi menu had been converted into a plant-based one, and traditional sweetened white rice was replaced with a whole grain brown rice-based blend. In 2005, Miya's introduced its first invasive species menu, featuring locally caught invasive species such as Asian shore crabs and European green crabs.

Reception and awards
2018: James Beard Foundation - Finalist for Blind Sushi
2016: White House Champions of Change for sustainable seafood
2013: James Beard Foundation - Best Chef nominee
Best of New England - Yankee Magazine
Best restaurants in Connecticut - Expert's Picks
Monterey Bay Aquarium - Sustainable Seafood Award and 2011 Seafood Ambassador Award
Fish2Fork - top 10 most sustainable seafood restaurants in the U.S.
2010: Elm Ivy Award
Key to the City of New Haven

In popular culture
Miya's was lampooned by Saturday Night Live for its use of cicadas in sushi.
Miya's appeared on Good Food America.
Miya's chef Bun Lai appeared as a contestant on Food Network's Chopped.

See also
 List of sushi restaurants

References

External links
Miya's Sushi

Restaurants in Connecticut
Defunct restaurants in the United States
Restaurants established in 1982
Tourist attractions in New Haven, Connecticut
1982 establishments in Connecticut
Sushi restaurants in the United States
Defunct Japanese restaurants